The Breitach is a  mountain river, the southwestern (left) source of the Iller in the Allgäu Alps, in the states of Vorarlberg (Austria) and Bavaria (Germany).

Detail
It flows in the northwestern direction through the valley that in earlier times was called  ("Breitach Valley") after the river. Then, the Starzlach flows from the west into the Breitach. At the so-called  ("Iller origin") in Oberstdorf, the Breitach, the Stillach and the Trettach flow together forming the Iller.

Of geological interest are the so-called Breitach rocks; a mineral of brown color and of small fracture, it is only found in the Breitach.

References

Sources

 Breitach-Flussbeschreibung für Kanusportler
 Das Oberstdorfer Breitachtal

Rivers of Bavaria
Rivers of Vorarlberg
Rivers of Austria
Rivers of Germany
International rivers of Europe